"And So It Went" is a song recorded by American rock band the Pretty Reckless featuring American guitarist Tom Morello for the former's fourth studio album, Death by Rock and Roll (2021). Group members Taylor Momsen and Ben Phillips co-wrote the song and co-produced it with Jonathan Wyman. "And So It Went" was released January 8, 2021 as the second single from the album.

Critical reception
Mike DeWald of Riff Magazine cited the song as "one of the album's best moments," praising the grunge influence and Morello's guitar solo. Emily Carter of Kerrang! was similarly complementary towards the solo, writing that "[the] guitar hero leaves an almighty impact with his riffing."

Commercial performance
"And So It Went" reached number one on the Billboard Mainstream Rock chart, becoming the group's sixth song to top that chart and extending the band's record for the female-fronted group with the most number ones. The song also became the group's fifth top-ten on the Canada Rock chart, peaking at number five.

Music video
An accompanying music video for "And So It Went" was directed by Jon J and Taylor Momsen and premiered February 4, 2021. It opens with a shot of Tom Morello's famous “Soul Power” Stratocaster guitar but Morello himself does not appear in the clip. The clip's "darkly affecting" visuals reflect the song's lyrics, which Momsen said were inspired by the world being in "a state of civil unrest."

Track listing
Digital single
 "And So It Went" – 4:30
 "25" – 5:26
 "Death by Rock and Roll" – 3:54

Charts

Weekly charts

Year-end charts

Release history

References

2021 songs
2021 singles
The Pretty Reckless songs
Fearless Records singles
Songs written by Taylor Momsen